Ahuiyeh (also Romanized as Āhū’īyeh) is a village in Bezenjan Rural District, in the Central District of Baft County, Kerman Province, Iran. At the 2006 census, its population was 524, in 128 families.

References 

Populated places in Baft County